The 2014 Toronto municipal election was held on October 27, 2014, to elect a mayor and 44 city councillors in Toronto, Ontario, Canada. In addition, school trustees were elected to the Toronto District School Board, Toronto Catholic District School Board, Conseil scolaire de district du Centre-Sud-Ouest and Conseil scolaire de district catholique Centre-Sud. The election was held in conjunction with those held in other municipalities in the province of Ontario. Candidate registration opened on January 2, 2014, and closed on September 12, 2014, at 2pm EST.

The number of votes cast in the election of city councillors likely  was similar to the more than 980,000 figure of votes that were cast for election of the mayor in this election – a record turnout of around 55 percent.

Christin Carmichael Greb received perhaps the lowest percentage of the vote for a successful candidate in the history of Canada in this election. Less than 18 percent of the vote in her district was enough for her to take the seat in Ward 16. She received about 4000 votes, .4 percent of the voters cast across the city, although the seat she would fill would be 2.3 percent of the chamber.

City council
City councillors were elected to represent Toronto's 44 wards at Toronto City Council. 36 out of 37 incumbent councillors were re-elected to their previous seat.

Incumbents 2010-2014

School boards
School trustees were elected to the: 
 Toronto District School Board
 Toronto Catholic District School Board
 Conseil scolaire de district du Centre-Sud-Ouest
 Conseil scolaire de district catholique Centre-Sud.

Issues

Transit
In the Greater Toronto Area, the average time spent commuting to and from work is 80 minutes, making it the worst among 19 large urban areas in North America. Transit was a major issue because of several controversial projects in the city, such as the use of subway versus light rail transit technology to replace the Scarborough RT, congested TTC streetcars, construction disruption from the Eglinton Crosstown, and the electrification of the Union Pearson Express. Proposals by Metrolinx to impose revenue tools to fund transit were also a source of controversy. The Toronto Region Board of Trade and TTC CEO Andy Byford stated that transit must be a critical issue that voters consider in the election.

Rob Ford
Much attention was given to allegations against Rob Ford during the 2014 election, and his admission on November 5, 2013, to smoking crack cocaine.

Ranked ballots and voting rights for permanent residents
On June 11, 2013, Toronto City Council passed a motion asking the Government of Ontario to give permanent residents the right to participate in municipal elections and to allow the city to adopt Ranked choice balloting (single-winner Instant-runoff voting), which would give voters the option to rank candidates in order of preference. Twenty-six councillors supported the motion and fifteen were against it. Following the council move, the Ranked Ballot Initiative of Toronto sent a petition with over eight thousand signatures to the provincial government, endorsing the council motion and requesting swift action on electoral reform. The Liberal MPP for Scarborough-Guildwood, Mitzie Hunter, then introduced the Toronto Ranked Ballots Election Act in March 2014. The bill was passed on the second reading but died prematurely when the Ontario election was called.

Other
In the wake of substance abuse allegations against Rob Ford, the possibility of reversing the 1998 amalgamation of Toronto was raised.

Results

Ward 1 - Etobicoke North

Ward 2 - Etobicoke North
Incumbent mayor Rob Ford, ran in Ward 2 after withdrawing from the mayoral election for health reasons. His nephew, Michael Ford, withdrew from the councillor election and was elected as TDSB trustee (and later elected as Ward 2 councillor in a by-election after Rob Ford's death).

Ward 3 - Etobicoke Centre
Incumbent Peter Leon did not run (Leon was appointed to replace Doug Holyday in 2014).

Ward 4 - Etobicoke Centre
Incumbent Gloria Lindsay Luby did not run for re-election.

Ward 5 - Etobicoke—Lakeshore
Incumbent James Maloney did not run for re-election. (Maloney was appointed to replace Peter Milczyn in 2014.)

Ward 6 - Etobicoke—Lakeshore

Ward 7 - York West

Ward 8 - York West

Ward 9 - York Centre

Ward 10 - York Centre

Ward 11 - York South—Weston

Ward 12 - York South—Weston

Ward 13 - Parkdale—High Park

Ward 14 - Parkdale—High Park

Ward 15 - Eglinton—Lawrence

Ward 16 - Eglinton—Lawrence
Incumbent Karen Stintz was running for Mayor but dropped out and declared she would not be running for council.

Ward 17 - Davenport

Ward 18 - Davenport

Ward 19 - Trinity—Spadina

Ward 20 - Trinity—Spadina

Incumbent Ceta Ramkhalawansingh did not run. She was appointed in 2014 to replace Adam Vaughan who resigned and was elected to the Canadian Parliament.

Ward 21 - St. Paul's

Ward 22 - St. Paul's

Ward 23 - Willowdale

Ward 24 - Willowdale

Ward 25 - Don Valley West

Ward 26 - Don Valley West

Ward 27 - Toronto Centre

Ward 28 - Toronto Centre

Ward 29 - Toronto—Danforth

Ward 30 - Toronto—Danforth

Ward 31 - Beaches—East York

Ward 32 - Beaches—East York

Ward 33 - Don Valley East

Ward 34 - Don Valley East

Ward 35 - Scarborough Southwest

Ward 36 - Scarborough Southwest

Ward 37 - Scarborough Centre

Ward 38 - Scarborough Centre

Ward 39 - Scarborough—Agincourt
Incumbent Mike Del Grande did not run for re-election to Council, but ran for the Ward 7 Toronto Catholic School Board seat and replaced his son, John Del Grande, who did not run for re-election after holding the seat for 11 years.

Ward 40 - Scarborough—Agincourt

Ward 41 - Scarborough—Rouge River

Ward 42 - Scarborough—Rouge River

Ward 43 - Scarborough East

Ward 44 - Scarborough East

References

External links

City of Toronto election webpage

2014
Toronto
2014 in Toronto